MNAA is the acronym of the National Museum of Ancient Art in Lisbon, Portugal.
It may also stand for:
Metropolitan Nashville Airport Authority
Metrolina Native American Association
UDP-N-acetylglucosamine 2-epimerase, an enzyme